Lewis Allen Dingle (born 16 September 1988) is an English former first-class cricketer and physician.

Dingle was born at Blackpool in September 1988. He was educated at Rossall School, before going up to Christ Church, Oxford. While studying at Oxford, he played first-class cricket on three occasions for Oxford University against Cambridge University in The University Matches of 2007, 2008 and 2010. After graduating from Oxford, Dingle trained to become a plastic surgeon.

While at Rossall School he was affectionately known as "Ron" for reasons that are now lost to history.

References

External links

1988 births
Living people
People from Blackpool
People educated at Rossall School
Alumni of Christ Church, Oxford
English cricketers
Oxford University cricketers
21st-century English medical doctors